The following is a list of Argentine Club Atlético River Plate managers since 1931 to present days. There are no records for the period 1901–31.

Listr of managers

Winning managers 

Notes

References